Aase Wind Lionæs (10 April 1907  –  2 January 1999) was a Norwegian politician for the Labour Party, and a socialist feminist.

Biography
She was born in Oslo.

Lionæs was a member of Oslo city council during the terms 1934–1937 and 1945–1947. In 1946 she was one of the delegates of the United Nations General Assembly. She was elected to the Norwegian Parliament from Oslo in 1958, and was re-elected on four occasions. She had previously served in the position of deputy representative during the term 1954–1957, during which she met as a regular representative for Rakel Seweriin and later Einar Gerhardsen who both held positions in the Cabinet. She was also a member of the Norwegian Nobel Committee from 1948 to 1968 and its head from 1968 to 1978. She also served as vice president of the Lagting from 1965 to 1973 and of the Odelsting from 1973 to 1977.

She founded the friendship association Friends of Israel in the Norwegian Labour Movement (Norwegian: Venner av Israel i Norsk Arbeiderbevegelse).

References

External links

1907 births
1999 deaths
Labour Party (Norway) politicians
Members of the Storting
Chairpersons of the Norwegian Nobel Committee
Norwegian socialist feminists
20th-century Norwegian women politicians